Heptalene is a polycyclic hydrocarbon with chemical formula , composed of two fused cycloheptatriene rings. It is an unstable, non-planar compound which is non-aromatic. The dianion, however, satisfies Hückel's rule, is thermally stable, and is planar.

See also 
Benzocyclooctatetraene

References